The 2014 European Parliament election for the election of the delegation from the Netherlands was held on May 22, 2014.
This is the 8th time the elections have been held for the European elections in the Netherlands.

Sources for everything below:

About the candidate lists

Participation of political groups 
On Monday 14 April 2014, the Electoral Council had a public hearing on the validity of the lists of candidates for the election of the Dutch seats for the European Parliament.
The candidate list of the Women's Party was declared invalid because the required deposit to participate (€11,250) was not paid. 
Furthermore, the following candidates of the Party for the Animals were deleted because their documentation was incomplete and, as such, could not participate in the election:
T. Regan (United States); 
W. T. Kymlicka (Canada);
J.M. Coetzee (Australia).

Numbering of the candidates list 
In the public hearing on April 14, 2014, the Electoral Council numbered the lists of candidates. The parties who had obtained one or more seats in 2009 at the last election to the European Parliament were given a number based on the number of votes that the parties had achieved in the previous election. These totaled 8 candidate lists. The party with the most votes got number 1 and the rest were listed accordingly. The list numbers for the remaining 11 candidates were decided by a lottery.

The official order and names of candidate lists:

| colspan="6" | 
|-
! style="background-color:#E9E9E9;text-align:center;vertical-align:top;" colspan=5 | Lists
|-
!style="background-color:#E9E9E9;text-align:center;" colspan="3"|List
!style="background-color:#E9E9E9;| English translation
!style="background-color:#E9E9E9;| List name (Dutch)
|-
| 1
| 
| style="text-align:left;" | list
| style="text-align:left;" | CDA - European People's Party
| style="text-align:left;" | CDA — Europese Volkspartij

|-
| 2
| 
| style="text-align:left;" | list
| style="text-align:left;" |  PVV (Party for Freedom)
| style="text-align:left;" | PVV (Partij voor de Vrijheid)

|-
| 3
| 
| style="text-align:left;" | list
| style="text-align:left;" | P.v.d.A./European Social Democrats
| style="text-align:left;" | P.v.d.A./Europese Sociaaldemocraten

|-
| 4
| 
| style="text-align:left;" | list
| style="text-align:left;" colspan="2" | VVD

|-
| 5
| 
| style="text-align:left;" | list
| style="text-align:left;" | Democrats 66 (D66) - ALDE
| style="text-align:left;" | Democraten 66 (D66) - ALDE

|-
| 6
| 
| style="text-align:left;" | list
| style="text-align:left;" | GreenLeft
| style="text-align:left;" | GroenLinks

|-
| 7
| 
| style="text-align:left;" | list
| style="text-align:left;" | SP (Socialist Party)
| style="text-align:left;" | SP (Socialistische Partij)

|-
| 8	
| 
| style="text-align:left;" | list
| style="text-align:left;" | Christian Union-SGP
| style="text-align:left;" | ChristenUnie–SGP

|-
| 9
| 
| style="text-align:left;" | list
| style="text-align:left;" | Article 50
| style="text-align:left;" | Artikel 50

|-
| 10
| 
| style="text-align:left;" | list
| style="text-align:left;" | IQ, the Rights-Obligations-Party	
| style="text-align:left;" | IQ, de Rechten-Plichten-Partij

|-
| 11
| 
| style="text-align:left;" | list
| style="text-align:left;" | Pirate Party
| style="text-align:left;" | Piratenpartij

|-
| 12
| 
| style="text-align:left;" | list
| style="text-align:left;" colspan="2" | 50PLUS

|-
| 13
| 
| style="text-align:left;" | list
| style="text-align:left;" | The Greens
| style="text-align:left;" | De Groenen

|-
| 14
| 
| style="text-align:left;" | list
| style="text-align:left;" | Anti EU(ro) Party
| style="text-align:left;" | Anti EU(ro) Partij

|-
| 15
| 
| style="text-align:left;" | list
| style="text-align:left;" | Liberal Democratic Party	
| style="text-align:left;" | Liberaal Democratische Partij

|-
| 16
| 
| style="text-align:left;" | list
| style="text-align:left;" | Jesus Lives
| style="text-align:left;" | Jezus Leeft

|-
| 17
| 
| style="text-align:left;" | list
| style="text-align:left;" | ichooseforhonest.eu
| style="text-align:left;" | ikkiesvooreerlijk.eu

|-
| 18
| 
| style="text-align:left;" | list
| style="text-align:left;" | Party for the Animals
| style="text-align:left;" | Partij voor de Dieren

|-
| 19
| 
| style="text-align:left;" | list
| style="text-align:left;" | Focus and Simplicity	
| style="text-align:left;" | Aandacht en Eenvoud

|-
|}

Candidate lists

CDA - European People's Party 

Below is the candidate list for the Christian Democratic Appeal for the 2014 European Parliament election

Elected members are in bold

PVV (Party for Freedom) 

Below is the candidate list for the Party for Freedom for the 2014 European Parliament election

Elected members are in bold

P.v.d.A./European Social Democrats 

Below is the candidate list for the Labour Party for the 2014 European Parliament election

Elected members are in bold

VVD 

Below is the candidate list for the People's Party for Freedom and Democracy for the 2014 European Parliament election

Elected members are in bold

Democrats 66 (D66) - ALDE 

Below is the candidate list for the Democrats 66 for the 2014 European Parliament election

Elected members are in bold

GreenLeft 

Below is the candidate list for the GreenLeft for the 2014 European Parliament election

Elected members are in bold

SP (Socialist Party) 

Below is the candidate list for the Socialist Party for the 2014 European Parliament election

Elected members are in bold

Christian Union-SGP 
Below is the candidate list for the Christian Union-SGP for the 2014 European Parliament election

Elected members are in bold

Article 50 
Below is the candidate list for the Article 50 for the 2014 European Parliament election

IQ, the Rights-Obligations-Party 
Below is the candidate list for the IQ, the Rights-Obligations-Party for the 2014 European Parliament election

Pirate Party 

Below is the candidate list for the Pirate Party for the 2014 European Parliament election

50PLUS 

Below is the candidate list for the 50PLUS for the 2014 European Parliament election

The Greens 

Below is the candidate list for The Greens for the 2014 European Parliament election

Anti EU(ro) Party 
Below is the candidate list for the Anti EU(ro) Party for the 2014 European Parliament election

Liberal Democratic Party 

Below is the candidate list for Liberal Democratic Party for the 2014 European Parliament election

Jesus Lives 

Below is the candidate list for Jesus Lives for the 2014 European Parliament election

ichooseforhonest.eu 
Below is the candidate list for ichooseforhonest.eu for the 2014 European Parliament election

Party for the Animals 

Below is the candidate list for the Party for the Animals for the 2014 European Parliament election

Elected members are in bold

Focus and Simplicity 
Below is the candidate list for Focus and Simplicity for the 2014 European Parliament election

References

2014
Netherlands